Jon Astley is a British record producer who has also recorded and released two albums as a singer-songwriter in the late 1980s. His most commercially successful song was "Jane's Getting Serious", later popularized by a Heinz ketchup television commercial starring a pre-Friends Matt LeBlanc.

As a producer, he is best known for his co-production work with Glyn Johns on the Who's 1978 Who Are You album, and later remastering supervision for all of the group's back catalog reissues.

He also has produced albums for Eric Clapton, Barclay James Harvest, Corey Hart, and Deborah Harry and has mastered records for the Who, ABBA, George Harrison, Tori Amos, Eric Clapton, the Rolling Stones, the Pretty Things, Jools Holland, Tom Jones, Judas Priest, Cloven Hoof, Emmylou Harris, Ella Guru, Damien Dempsey, Tears for Fears, Led Zeppelin, Hothouse Flowers, Level 42, The Boomtown Rats, John Mayall, Marilyn Martin, Toto, Norah Jones, Stereophonics, KT Tunstall, Van Morrison, Paul McCartney, Peter Gabriel, Slade, Sting, Bono, Starlite Campbell Band and Anathema.

Astley is, by way of his sister Karen, the ex-brother-in-law of Who guitarist Pete Townshend, as well as the brother of recording artist Virginia Astley and son of noted composer Edwin "Ted" Astley. He is married to novelist Judy Astley. He is not related to Rick Astley.

Discography

Studio albums
 Everyone Loves the Pilot (Except the Crew) (1987)
 The Compleat Angler (1988)

Singles

References

External links

 [ Jon Astley] at AllMusic
 

Year of birth missing (living people)
Place of birth missing (living people)
Living people
British male singer-songwriters
British record producers